Cuatro en la trampa  (English title: Four in the trap) is a Mexican telenovela produced by Televisa and transmitted by Telesistema Mexicano.

Adriana Roel and Ignacio López Tarso starred as protagonists, Fernando Luján starred as main antagonist.

Cast 
Adriana Roel
Ignacio López Tarso
Fernando Luján
Armando Silvestre
Andrea López
Rubén Rojo

References 

Mexican telenovelas
1961 telenovelas
Televisa telenovelas
1961 Mexican television series debuts
1961 Mexican television series endings
Spanish-language telenovelas